The 1995 Sta. Lucia Realtors season was the 3rd season of the franchise in the Philippine Basketball Association (PBA).

Draft picks

Occurrences
During the off-season, the Sta.Lucia Realtors match the P 28.8 million, five-year offer sheet by Pepsi Mega to Jun Limpot, making the former La Salle Green Archer the highest paid local player in the PBA.

Sta.Lucia was fined by the PBA office for the below-par showing of the team in the last day of the eliminations of the All-Filipino Cup on April 7 wherein the Realtors lost to Alaska Milkmen which ousted three other teams hoping to create a four-way tie for the fifth and last semifinals berth had Sta.Lucia won.

Summary
On March 24, top draft pick Dennis Espino finally debut in leading the Realtors to a 95–91 win over San Miguel in the out-of-town game in Tuguegarao. Sta.Lucia enters the semifinal round with five wins and five losses, the Realtors were a win away from earning a finals playoff berth via win five games in the semifinals but they lost to Purefoods, 90–92, in their last game on April 30 and were booted out from the finals race. Sta.Lucia placed third with a two-game sweep over Purefoods in their best-of-three series.  

After original choice Clifford Reed was sent home and never got a chance to play in the Commissioners Cup, Antoine Davison came as a late replacement and played poorly, scoring only 14 points despite the Realtors winning over Alaska in overtime, 101–97, in their first game on June 11, Davison lasted just one game and was replaced by Sam Mack, who also played only one game and left, leaving the Realtors importless in their next two games.  Sta.Lucia finally got the right import in Frederick Pea and since his arrival, the Realtors won six straight games to finish second with eight wins and two losses, a game behind Sunkist after the eliminations. Sta.Lucia were tied with Alaska at 10 wins and five loss after the quarterfinal round. Both teams were seeded number two and three and will play against each other in the best-of-five semifinals. The Realtors were swept in three games by the Milkmen. Sta.Lucia placed third with another two-game sweep over Purefoods in their series for third place.

Coach Nat Canson brought in former North Carolina State's Kelsey Weems as their import but Weems left even before the Governors Cup started after he figured in a spat with Gerald Esplana. Coming in was Robert Francis Allen, a Canadian national player whose stint in the PBA was his first overseas assignment. The Realtors were four wins and five losses going into their last game in the eliminations on November 10, hoping to create at least a tie for the fifth semifinals berth if San Miguel losses in the second game of the doubleheader, but Sta.Lucia were upset and eliminated by also-ran Pepsi Mega, 91–97, with Robert Allen skipping the game due to an injury.

Roster

Transactions

Additions

Trades

Recruited imports

References

Sta. Lucia
Sta. Lucia Realtors seasons